Mahalli bin Jasuli (born 2 April 1989) is a Malaysian footballer who plays for Malaysia Super League club Negeri Sembilan as a forward. He also can play as a right-back and winger.

Club career
Mahalli captained Harimau Muda A (Malaysian Under-23) when the team participated in the 2012 S. League. Mahalli helped Harimau Muda A to finish in 4th place.

For the 2013 season, Mahalli officially signed for Selangor. His first goal for Selangor came on 9 March 2013 in a 4–1 defeat of Johor Darul Ta'zim.

Johor Darul Ta'zim
Mahalli made his debut for Johor Darul Ta'zim in a 2–0 win over Perak on 18 January 2014.

PKNS
On 26 January 2018, Mahalli agreed to join PKNS on a season-long loan move from Johor Darul Ta'zim.

Negeri Sembilan FC 
He was officially announced as a new Negeri Sembilan FC player on 12 January 2023.

International career
Mahalli was a regular starter for the Malaysian national football team and has been hailed as South East Asia's brightest talent by Asian football pundits and journalists. Mahalli is well known for his forward forays and dangerous crossing. The fullback also has a keen eye for goal and the spectacular. One of the highlights of his international career was in 2009, when he played twice against Manchester United during United's preseason tour of the Far East.

In November 2010, Mahalli was called up to the Malaysia national squad by coach K. Rajagopal for the 2010 AFF Suzuki Cup. The young right-back scored his first international goal in that tournament against Laos during the final group game and subsequently went on to help Malaysia win the 2010 AFF Suzuki Cup title for the first time in their history.

Mahalli was called up for 2012 AFF Suzuki Cup. Mahali scored a goal against Indonesia in the third match. Mahalli fails to help Malaysia progress to final after losing to Thailand on the semi-final but show excellence performances on the tournament.

Personal life
His grandmother from Gresik, East Java, Indonesia.
In August 2015, Mahalli tied the knot with his fiancee during mid of eid' fitri weeks.

Career statistics

Club

International

International goals
Scores and results list Malaysia's goal tally first.

Malaysia XI

Honours

Club
Johor Darul Ta'zim
 Malaysian Charity Shield (2): 2015, 2016
 Malaysia Super League (5): 2014, 2015, 2016, 2017, 2018
 Malaysia Cup (1): 2017
 AFC Cup (1): 2015
 Malaysia FA Cup (1): 2016

International
Malaysia
 AFF Suzuki Cup (1): 2010 ; Runner-up 2014
 Southeast Asian Games (2): 2009, 2011

Individual
 Goal.com Asian Best XI for November 2012

References

External links
 
 

1989 births
Living people
Javanese people
Malaysian people of Javanese descent
Malaysian people of Indonesian descent
Malaysian footballers
Malaysia international footballers
People from Selangor
Selangor FA players
Johor Darul Ta'zim F.C. players
Negeri Sembilan FC players
Malaysia Super League players
Association football fullbacks
Footballers at the 2010 Asian Games
Southeast Asian Games gold medalists for Malaysia
Southeast Asian Games medalists in football
Competitors at the 2009 Southeast Asian Games
Competitors at the 2011 Southeast Asian Games
Asian Games competitors for Malaysia
AFC Cup winning players